Charles de Batz de Castelmore d'Artagnan (c. 1611 – 25 June 1673) was captain of Louis XIV's Musketeers.

D'Artagnan may also refer to:

 The d'Artagnan Romances, a set of three novels by Alexandre Dumas, which concern a romanticized version of the Comte d'Artagnan, the most famous of which is The Three Musketeers
 D'Artagnan (food company), a producer of specialty food products
 14238 d'Artagnan, a main-belt asteroid
 Son of d'Artagnan, a 1950 Italian film
 Artagnan, a French municipality in Midi-Pyrénées region
 dArtagnan, a German folk rock band
 D'Artagnan, a large  cutter suction dredger, belonging to the DEME Group, launched in 2005 and sailing under the French flag.

See also